Boric acid, more specifically orthoboric acid, is a compound of boron, oxygen, and hydrogen with formula . It may also be called hydrogen borate, boron hydroxide or boracic acid. It is usually encountered as colorless crystals or a white powder, that dissolves in water, and occurs in nature as the mineral sassolite.   It is a weak acid that yields various borate anions and salts, and can react with alcohols to form borate esters.

Boric acid is often used as an antiseptic, insecticide, flame retardant, neutron absorber, or precursor to other boron compounds.

The term "boric acid" is also used generically for any oxoacid of boron, such as metaboric acid  and tetraboric acid .

History

Orthoboric acid was first prepared by Wilhelm Homberg (1652–1715) from borax, by the action of mineral acids, and was given the name  ("sedative salt of Homberg"). However boric acid and borates have been used since the time of the ancient Greeks for cleaning, preserving food, and other activities.

Molecular and crystal structure
The three oxygen atoms form a trigonal planar geometry around the boron. The B-O bond length is 136 pm and the O-H is 97 pm. The molecular point group is C3h.

Two crystalline forms of orthoboric acid are known: triclinic and hexagonal. The former is the most common; the second, which is a bit more stable thermodynamically, can be obtained with a special preparation method.

Triclinic
The triclinic form of boric acid consists of layers of  molecules held together by hydrogen bonds of length 272 pm. The distance between two adjacent layers is 318 pm.

Preparation

Boric acid may be prepared by reacting borax (sodium tetraborate decahydrate) with a mineral acid, such as hydrochloric acid:

 ·10 + 2 HCl → 4  + 2 NaCl + 5 

It is also formed as a by product of hydrolysis of boron trihalides and diborane:

  + 6  → 2  + 6 

  + 3  →  + 3 HX (X = Cl, Br, I)

Reactions

Pyrolysis
When heated, orthoboric acid undergoes a three step dehydration. The reported transition temperatures vary substantially from source to source.

When heated above 140 °C, orthoboric acid yields metaboric acid with loss of one water molecule:

  →  + 

Heating metaboric acid above about 180 °C eliminates another water molecule forming tetraboric acid, also called pyroboric acid:

 4  →  + 

Further heating (to about 530 °C) leads to boron trioxide:

  → 2  +

Aqueous solution
When orthoboric acid is dissolved in water, it partially dissociates to give metaboric acid:
     + 
The solution is mildly acidic due to ionization of the acids:
  +    + 
  +    + 

 +   
Equivalently,
 +    +  (K = 7.3×10−10; pK = 9.14)
Or, more properly,
 + 2    + 
This reaction occurs in two steps, with the neutral complex aquatrihydroxyboron  as an intermediate:
 +  → 
 +  +  →  + 

This reaction may be characterized as Lewis acidity of boron toward , rather than as Brønsted acidity. However, some of its behaviour towards some chemical reactions suggest it to be tribasic acid in the Brønsted sense as well.

Boric acid, mixed with borax  (more properly ) in the weight ratio of 4:5, is highly soluble in water, though they are not so soluble separately.

Sulfuric acid solution

Boric acid also dissolves in anhydrous sulfuric acid according to the equation

 + 6  →  + 2  + 3

Esterification
Boric acid reacts with alcohols to form borate esters,  where R is alkyl or aryl. The reaction is typically driven by a dehydrating agent, such as concentrated sulfuric acid:

 + 3 ROH →  + 3

With vicinal diols
The acidity of boric acid solutions is greatly increased in the presence of cis-vicinal diols (organic compounds containing similarly oriented hydroxyl groups in adjacent carbon atoms) such as glycerol and mannitol.

The tetrahydroxyborate anion formed in the dissolution spontaneously reacts with these diols to form relatively stable anion esters containing one or two five-member  rings. For example, the reaction with mannitol , whose two middle hydroxyls are in cis orientation, can be written as
  +    +  
  +    + 2  
  +    + 2 
Giving the overall reaction 
  + 2    + 3  + 

The stability of these mannitoborate ester anions shifts the equilibrium of the right and thus increases the acidity of the solution by 5 orders of magnitude compared to that of pure boric oxide, lowering the pKa from 9 to below 4 for sufficient concentration of mannitol. The resulting solution has been called mannitoboric acid.

The addition of mannitol to an initially neutral solution containing boric acid or simple borates lowers its pH enough for it to be titrated by a strong base as NaOH, including with an automated a potentiometric titrator.  This property is used in analytical chemistry to determine the borate content of aqueous solutions, for example to monitor the depletion of boric acid by neutrons in the water of the primary circuit of light-water reactor when the compound is added as a neutron poison during refueling operations.

Toxicology
Based on mammalian median lethal dose (LD50) rating of 2,660 mg/kg body mass, boric acid is only poisonous if taken internally or inhaled in large quantities. The Fourteenth Edition of the Merck Index indicates that the LD50 of boric acid is 5.14 g/kg for oral dosages given to rats, and that 5 to 20 g/kg has produced death in adult humans. For a 70 kg adult, at the lower 5g limit, 350g could produce death in humans. For comparison's sake, the LD50 of salt is reported to be 3.75 g/kg in rats according to the Merck Index. According to the Agency for Toxic Substances and Disease Registry, "The minimal lethal dose of ingested boron (as boric acid) was reported to be 2–3 g in infants, 5–6 g in children, and 15–20 g in adults. [...] However, a review of 784 human poisonings with boric acid (10–88 g) reported no fatalities, with 88% of cases being asymptomatic."

Long-term exposure to boric acid may be of more concern, causing kidney damage and eventually kidney failure (see links below). Although it does not appear to be carcinogenic, studies in dogs have reported testicular atrophy after exposure to 32 mg/kg bw/day for 90 days. This level, were it applicable to humans at like dose, would equate to a cumulative dose of 202g over 90 days for a 70 kg adult, not far lower than the above LD50.

According to the CLH report for boric acid published by the Bureau for Chemical Substances Lodz, Poland, boric acid in high doses shows significant developmental toxicity and teratogenicity in rabbit, rat, and mouse fetuses as well as cardiovascular defects, skeletal variations, and mild kidney lesions. As a consequence in the 30th ATP to EU directive 67/548/EEC of August 2008, the European Commission decided to amend its classification as reprotoxic category 2, and to apply the risk phrases R60 (may impair fertility) and R61 (may cause harm to the unborn child).

At a 2010 European Diagnostics Manufacturing Association (EDMA) Meeting, several new additions to the Substance of Very High Concern (SVHC) candidate list in relation to the Registration, Evaluation, Authorisation and Restriction of Chemicals Regulations 2007 (REACH) were discussed. Following the registration and review completed as part of REACH, the classification of Boric Acid CAS 10043-35-3 / 11113-50-1 is listed from 1 December 2010 is H360FD (May damage fertility. May damage the unborn child.)

Uses

Industrial
The primary industrial use of boric acid is in the manufacture of monofilament fiberglass usually referred to as textile fiberglass. Textile fiberglass is used to reinforce plastics in applications that range from boats, to industrial piping to computer circuit boards.

In the jewelry industry, boric acid is often used in combination with denatured alcohol to reduce surface oxidation and thus formation of firescale on metals during annealing and soldering operations.

Boric acid is used in the production of the glass in LCD flat panel displays.

In electroplating, boric acid is used as part of some proprietary formulas.

The solution of orthoboric acid and borax in 4:5 ratio is used as a fire retarding agent of wood by impregnation.

It is also used in the manufacturing of ramming mass, a fine silica-containing powder used for producing induction furnace linings and ceramics.

Boric acid is added to borax for use as welding flux by blacksmiths.

Boric acid, in combination with polyvinyl alcohol (PVA) or silicone oil, is used to manufacture Silly Putty.

Boric acid is also present in the list of chemical additives used for hydraulic fracturing (fracking) in the Marcellus Shale in Pennsylvania. Indeed, it is often used in conjonction with guar gum as cross-linking and gelling agent for controlling the viscosity and the rheology of the fracking fluid injected at high pressure in the well. Indeed, it is important to control the fluid viscosity for keeping in suspension on long transport distances the grains of the propping agents aimed at maintaining the cracks in the shales sufficiently open to facilitate the gas extraction after the hydraulic pressure is relieved. The rheological properties of borate cross-linked guar gum hydrogel mainly depend on the pH value.

Boric acid is used in some expulsion-type electrical fuses as a de-ionization/extinguishing agent. During an electrical fault in an expulsion-type fuse, a plasma arc is generated by the disintegration and rapid spring-loaded separation of the fusible element, which is typically a specialized metal rod that passes through a compressed mass of boric acid within the fuse assembly. The high-temperature plasma causes the boric acid to rapidly decompose into water vapor and boric anhydride, and in-turn, the vaporization products de-ionize the plasma, helping to interrupt the electrical fault.

Medical
Boric acid can be used as an antiseptic for minor burns or cuts and is sometimes used in salves and dressings, such as boracic lint. Boric acid is applied in a very dilute solution as an eye wash. Dilute boric acid can be used as a vaginal douche to treat bacterial vaginosis due to excessive alkalinity, as well as candidiasis due to non-albicans candida. Boric acid largely spares lactobacilli within the vagina. As TOL-463, it is under development as an intravaginal medication for the treatment of bacterial vaginosis and vulvovaginal candidiasis. As an antibacterial compound, boric acid can also be used as an acne treatment. It is also used as prevention of athlete's foot, by inserting powder in the socks or stockings. The preservative in urine sample bottles in the UK is boric acid.

Boric acid solutions used as an eye wash or on abraded skin are known to be toxic, particularly to infants, especially after repeated use; this is because of its slow elimination rate.

Boric acid is one of the most commonly used substances that can counteract the harmful effects of reactive hydrofluoric acid (HF) after an accidental contact with the skin. It works by forcing the free  anions into the inert tetrafluoroborate anion. This process defeats the extreme toxicity of hydrofluoric acid, particularly its ability to sequester ionic calcium from blood serum which can lead to cardiac arrest and bone decomposition; such an event can occur from just minor skin contact with HF.

Insecticidal
Boric acid was first registered in the US as an insecticide in 1948 for control of cockroaches, termites, fire ants, fleas, silverfish, and many other insects. The product is generally considered to be safe to use in household kitchens to control cockroaches and ants.  It acts as a stomach poison affecting the insects' metabolism, and the dry powder is abrasive to the insects' exoskeletons. Boric acid also has the reputation as "the gift that keeps on killing" in that cockroaches that cross over lightly dusted areas do not die immediately, but that the effect is like shards of glass cutting them apart. This often allows a roach to go back to the nest where it soon dies. Cockroaches, being cannibalistic, eat others killed by contact or consumption of boric acid, consuming the powder trapped in the dead roach and killing them, too.

Preservation
In combination with its use as an insecticide, boric acid also prevents and destroys existing wet and dry rot in timbers. It can be used in combination with an ethylene glycol carrier to treat external wood against fungal and insect attack. It is possible to buy borate-impregnated rods for insertion into wood via drill holes where dampness and moisture is known to collect and sit. It is available in a gel form and injectable paste form for treating rot affected wood without the need to replace the timber. Concentrates of borate-based treatments can be used to prevent slime, mycelium, and algae growth, even in marine environments.

Boric acid is added to salt in the curing of cattle hides, calfskins, and sheepskins. This helps to control bacterial development, and helps to control insects.

pH buffer

Boric acid in equilibrium with its conjugate base the borate ion is widely used (in the concentration range 50–100 ppm boron equivalents) as a primary or adjunct pH buffer system in swimming pools. Boric acid is a weak acid, with pK (the pH at which buffering is strongest because the free acid and borate ion are in equal concentrations) of 9.24 in pure water at 25 °C. But apparent pK is substantially lower in swimming pool or ocean waters because of interactions with various other molecules in solution. It will be around 9.0 in a salt-water pool. No matter which form of soluble boron is added, within the acceptable range of pH and boron concentration for swimming pools, boric acid is the predominant form in aqueous solution, as shown in the accompanying figure. The boric acid – borate system can be useful as a primary buffer system (substituting for the bicarbonate system with pK = 6.0 and pK = 9.4 under typical salt-water pool conditions) in pools with salt-water chlorine generators that tend to show upward drift in pH from a working range of pH 7.5–8.2. Buffer capacity is greater against rising pH (towards the pKa around 9.0), as illustrated in the accompanying graph. The use of boric acid in this concentration range does not allow any reduction in free HOCl concentration needed for pool sanitation, but it may add marginally to the photo-protective effects of cyanuric acid and confer other benefits through anti-corrosive activity or perceived water softness, depending on overall pool solute composition.

Lubrication
Colloidal suspensions of nanoparticles of boric acid dissolved in petroleum or vegetable oil can form a remarkable lubricant on ceramic or metal surfaces with a coefficient of sliding friction that decreases with increasing pressure to a value ranging from 0.10 to 0.02. Self-lubricating  films result from a spontaneous chemical reaction between water molecules and  coatings in a humid environment. In bulk-scale, an inverse relationship exists between friction coefficient and Hertzian contact pressure induced by applied load.

Boric acid is used to lubricate carrom and novuss boards, allowing for faster play.

Nuclear power
Boric acid is used in some nuclear power plants as a neutron poison. The boron in boric acid reduces the probability of thermal fission by absorbing some thermal neutrons. Fission chain reactions are generally driven by the probability that free neutrons will result in fission and is determined by the material and geometric properties of the reactor. Natural boron consists of approximately 20% boron-10 and 80% boron-11 isotopes. Boron-10 has a high cross-section for absorption of low energy (thermal) neutrons. By increasing boric acid concentration in the reactor coolant, the probability that a neutron will cause fission is reduced. Changes in boric acid concentration can effectively regulate the rate of fission taking place in the reactor. Boric acid is used only in pressurized water reactors (PWRs) whereas boiling water reactors (BWRs) employ control rod pattern and coolant flow for power control. BWRs use an aqueous solution of boric acid and borax or sodium pentaborate for an emergency shut down system. Boric acid may be dissolved in spent fuel pools used to store spent fuel elements. The concentration is high enough to keep neutron multiplication at a minimum. Boric acid was dumped over Reactor 4 of the Chernobyl nuclear power plant after its meltdown to prevent another reaction from occurring.

Pyrotechnics
Boron is used in pyrotechnics to prevent the amide-forming reaction between aluminium and nitrates. A small amount of boric acid is added to the composition to neutralize alkaline amides that can react with the aluminum.

Boric acid can be used as a colorant to make fire green. For example, when dissolved in methanol it is popularly used by fire jugglers and fire spinners to create a deep green flame much stronger than copper sulfate.

Agriculture
Boric acid is used to treat or prevent boron deficiencies in plants. It is also used in preservation of grains such as rice and wheat.

References

Further reading
 
 
 Cordia JA, Bal EA, Mak WA and Wils ERJ (2003), Determination of some physico-chemical properties of Optibor EP. Rijswijk, The Netherlands: TNO Prins Maurits Laboratory, report PML 2002-C42rr, GLP, Unpublished, confidential data provided by Bor ax Europe Limited

External links
 
 Boric Acid Technical Fact Sheet – National Pesticide Information Center
 Boric Acid General Fact Sheet – National Pesticide Information Center
 International Chemical Safety Card 0991
 US EPA Pesticide Reregistration Eligibility Decision
 National Pollutant Inventory – Boron and compounds
 Boric acid at ChemicalLand21
 European Chemicals Agency (ECHA)"New Public Consultation on Eight Potential Substances of Very High Concern" – includes Boric Acid. Closes 22 April 2010
 ChemSub Online: Boric acid

Antifungals
Antifungals for dermatologic use
Antiseptics
Ants
Borates
E-number additives
Inorganic compounds
Inorganic insecticides
Insecticides
Mineral acids
Neutron poisons
Otologicals
Photographic chemicals
Preservatives
Pyrotechnic chemicals
Rheology
Testicular toxicants